

133001–133100 

|-id=007
| 133007 Audreysimmons ||  || Audrey E. Simmons (born 1989), American astronomer with the Sloan Digital Sky Survey || 
|-id=008
| 133008 Snedden ||  || Stephanie Snedden (born 1950), American astronomer with the Sloan Digital Sky Survey || 
|-id=009
| 133009 Watters ||  || Shannon P. Watters (born 1972), American astronomer with the Sloan Digital Sky Survey || 
|-id=068
| 133068 Lisaschulze ||  || Lisa Schulze (born 1972) served as the Procurement Manager for the OTES instrument team on the OSIRIS-REx asteroid sample-return mission. Lisa is a Project Manager within Arizona State University, engaged in a variety of research projects. || 
|-id=074
| 133074 Kenshamordola ||  || Kenneth Shamordola (born 1943) is an electric engineer for the OTES instrument on the OSIRIS-REx asteroid sample-return mission. He is providing electronic design support for servo controllers and low noise signal channels for the OTES instrument design and testing. || 
|-id=077
| 133077 Jirsík ||  || Jan Valerián Jirsík (1798–1883), a Czech theologian, priest, writer and national revivalist || 
|}

133101–133200 

|-id=161
| 133161 Ruttkai ||  || Éva Ruttkai (1927–1986), Hungarian actress || 
|}

133201–133300 

|-id=243
| 133243 Essen ||  || The German city of Essen is located in the Ruhr area. It was the former center of the country's heavy industry. || 
|-id=250
| 133250 Rubik ||  || Ernő Rubik (born 1944), Hungarian architect and professor, internationally renowned for designing mechanical puzzles and games || 
|-id=280
| 133280 Bryleen ||  || Bryan Young (born 1976) and Eileen Young (born 1979), son and daughter of American astronomer James Whitney Young, who discovered this minor planet || 
|-id=293
| 133293 Andrushivka ||  || Andrushivka Astronomical Observatory, Zhytomyr, Ukraine, the discovery site (and its first discovery) || 
|-id=296
| 133296 Federicotosi ||  || Federico Tosi (born 1974), Italian astronomer and space scientist || 
|}

133301–133400 

|-bgcolor=#f2f2f2
| colspan=4 align=center | 
|}

133401–133500 

|-id=404
| 133404 Morogues ||  || The French village of Morogues, known for its white wine "appellation Menetou-Salon", and also for being the apex of one of the triangles used by Jean Baptiste Joseph Delambre in 1795 for the calculation of the meridian || 
|-id=432
| 133432 Sarahnoble ||  || Sarah K. Noble (born 1975), a discipline scientist for the Planetary Science Division at NASA. || 
|}

133501–133600 

|-id=527
| 133527 Fredearly || 2003 TZ || Frederick Young (1889–1974) and Pearl Young (1888–1958), paternal grandparents of American astronomer James Whitney Young who discovered this minor planet || 
|-id=528
| 133528 Ceragioli ||  || Roger Ceragioli (born 1959), American optician and telescope maker (formerly scholar of classical studies specializing in ancient Greek ethno-astronomy) || 
|-id=536
| 133536 Alicewhagel ||  || Alice Whagel (born 1969) has worked tirelessly for many years assisting amateur and professional astronomers with their CCD cameras and related equipment. || 
|-id=537
| 133537 Mariomotta ||  || Mario Motta, American cardiologist, amateur astronomer and telescope maker who was the president of the American Association of Variable Star Observers from 2011 to 2013 || 
|-id=552
| 133552 Itting-Enke ||  || Sonja Itting-Enke (born 1930), Namibian astronomical educator and founder of the Cuno Hoffmeister Memorial Observatory in Windhoek, named after Cuno Hoffmeister || 
|}

133601–133700 

|-bgcolor=#f2f2f2
| colspan=4 align=center | 
|}

133701–133800 

|-id=716
| 133716 Tomtourville ||  || Thomas Tourville (born 1940) is a consulting member of the mechanical design team on the OTES instrument on the OSIRIS-REx asteroid sample-return mission. He was the lead mechanical designer at Santa Barbara Research Center for both the TES and MiniTES. || 
|-id=726
| 133726 Gateswest ||  || Gates West (born 1963) is the lead electronics engineer for the Thermal Emission Spectrometer of the OSIRIS-REx asteroid sample-return mission. With more than 20 years in the space industry, he has designed and tested electronics for a wide variety of earth-orbiting and interplanetary spacecraft. || 
|-id=743
| 133743 Robertwoodward || 2003 WM || Rob Woodward (born 1967) is a Manufacturing Engineer for the OSIRIS-REx asteroid sample-return mission. Prior to joining the OTES team at ASU he was a Manufacturing Engineer and Cost Account Manager for space flight electronics with General Dynamics-AIS. || 
|-id=744
| 133744 Dellagiustina ||  || Daniella Della-Giustina (born 1986), the Image Processing Lead of the OSIRIS-REx asteroid sample-return mission who pioneered the photogrammetric mapping of small irregular bodies || 
|-id=745
| 133745 Danieldrinnon ||  || Daniel Drinnon (born 1960) a Systems Administrator at the Science Processing and Operations Center of the OSIRIS-REx asteroid sample-return mission. He is also an amateur astronomer whose main interests lie in restoring classic telescopes and using them for planetary imaging || 
|-id=746
| 133746 Tonyferro ||  || Anthony Ferro (born 1963), a Systems Administrator at the Science Processing and Operations Center of the OSIRIS-REx asteroid sample-return mission and the Phoenix Mars Mission || 
|-id=747
| 133747 Robertofurfaro ||  || Roberto Furfaro (born 1971) member of the OSIRIS-REx asteroid sample-return mission team. He has been involved as ground systems engineer, the Science Processing and Operations Center (SPOC) Systems Engineering Team Lead and the SPOC-Science Team Interface. || 
|-id=753
| 133753 Teresamullen ||  || Teresa Mullen (born 1959), American member of the Huachuca Astronomy Club of Sierra Vista, Arizona, and wife of vice-president Keith Mullen (see ) || 
|-id=756
| 133756 Carinajohnson ||  || Carina Johnson (born 1985), an Image Processing Engineer at the University of Arizona for the OSIRIS-REx asteroid sample-return mission. || 
|-id=773
| 133773 Lindsaykeller ||  || Lindsay Keller (born 1961) was leading the Carbonaceous Meteorite Working Group of the OSIRIS-REx asteroid sample-return mission. He is a member of the sample analysis team and will investigate the atomic-scale mineralogy and chemistry of the returned samples using electron microscopy with emphasis on space weathering effects. || 
|-id=774
| 133774 Johnkidd ||  || John Kidd (born 1989), a Science Processing and Operations Center Planning Engineer with the OSIRIS-REx asteroid sample-return mission. John was responsible for the development of the MASC tool, which was used to assist in the autonomous planning of science observations. || 
|-id=782
| 133782 Saraknutson ||  || Sara Balram Knutson (born 1987), a Science Processing and Operations Center Operations Engineer with the OSIRIS-REx asteroid sample-return mission. She contributed to SPOC strategic and tactical planning activities, including building science instrument sequences for execution on the spacecraft. || 
|}

133801–133900 

|-id=814
| 133814 Wenjengko ||  || Wenjeng Ko (born 1955), the Science Processing and Operations Center Software Architect and Lead of the OSIRIS-REx asteroid sample-return mission. He also worked on several of NASA's Mars and Asteroid missions, including Mars 2001 Odyssey, Mars Polar Lander, Near Earth Asteroid Rendezvous and Mars Observer || 
|-id=832
| 133832 Loveridge ||  || Michael Francis Ubaldo Loveridge (born 1993) worked on NASA's OSIRIS-REx Mission as a software engineer at the Science Processing and Operations Center. His primary contributions included work on science data assembly and processing software. || 
|-id=834
| 133834 Erinmorton ||  || Erin Morton (born 1975), the head of Communications and Public Engagement in the Principal Investigator's Office for the OSIRIS-REx asteroid sample-return mission. || 
|-id=850
| 133850 Heatherroper ||  || Heather Roper (born 1993), a Graphic Designer at the University of Arizona for the OSIRIS-REx asteroid sample-return mission || 
|-id=854
| 133854 Wargetz ||  || Annie Wargetz (born 1979), a social media lead and then as the technical documentation specialist for the SPOC of the OSIRIS-REx asteroid sample-return mission. Annie also worked in the Orion spacecraft program as a communications and outreach intern prior to the EFT-1 mission. || 
|-id=861
| 133861 Debrawilmer ||  || Debra Wilmer (born 1972), the Executive Assistant in the Principal Investigator's Office for the OSIRIS-REx asteroid sample-return mission. || 
|-id=874
| 133874 Jonnazucarelli ||  || Jonna L. Zucarelli (born 1987), the Business Operations Manager in the Principal Investigator's office for the OSIRIS-REx asteroid sample-return mission || 
|-id=889
| 133889 Nicholasmills ||  || Nicholas Ock-dan Mills (born 1983), a software engineer for the OSIRIS-REx asteroid sample-return mission. He also worked as an intern on the Dawn mission as a Ground Data Systems Engineer. || 
|-id=891
| 133891 Jaesubhong ||  || Jaesub Hong (born 1969) is an astronomer at the Harvard College Observatory serving as the lead scientist for the calibration and image reconstruction performed by the student-built Regolith X-ray Imaging Spectrometer aboard the OSIRIS-REx asteroid sample-return mission. || 
|-id=892
| 133892 Benkhaldoun ||  || Zouhair Benkhaldoun (born 1959), Moroccan researcher in Cadi Ayyad University's department of physics in Marrakech, Morocco || 
|}

133901–134000 

|-bgcolor=#f2f2f2
| colspan=4 align=center | 
|}

References 

133001-134000